The Pursuit of Persephone is a musical with music and lyrics by Peter Mills and book by Cara Reichel.  The show details F. Scott Fitzgerald's time at Princeton University, and his love for Ginevra King. Elements of the plot are loosely adapted from This Side of Paradise (Fitzgerald's own fictionalized account of his time at Princeton).

Productions 
The show premiered at the Connelly Theatre in New York City in 2005, featuring Chris Fuller as F. Scott Fitzgerald and Jessica Grové as Ginevra King.

In 2006 much of the original cast returned for a concert reading of the show at the Lucille Lortel Theatre. That same year, a production of the show was staged at the University of Michigan, starring Justin Paul as F. Scott Fitzgerald.

In 2014 the show was reworked and presented by the Prospect Theater Company under the name "The Underclassman".

Cast

Reception 
The show received some praise for its music, costuming, and casting, but often received criticism for its book.

The 2014 production similarly was praised for its music, while critics felt the underlying story was not interesting enough to captivate audiences.

Awards

External links
The Pursuit of Persephone Review from Broadway World
The Pursuit of Persephone Review from Paradise Revisited
The Pursuit of Persephone Review from The New York Times

References

Off-Broadway musicals
Musicals inspired by real-life events
2005 musicals
Cultural depictions of F. Scott Fitzgerald